Sukhodolovka is a rural locality in Dyakonovsky Selsoviet Rural Settlement, Oktyabrsky District, Kursk Oblast, Russia. Population:

Geography 
The village is located in the Seym River basin (a left tributary of the Desna), 70 km from the Russia–Ukraine border, 18 km south-west of Kursk, 1.5 km south-west of the district center – the urban-type settlement Pryamitsyno, at the northern border of the selsoviet center – Dyakonovo.

 Climate
Sukhodolovka has a warm-summer humid continental climate (Dfb in the Köppen climate classification).

Transport 

The rural locality is situated 26 km from Kursk Vostochny Airport, 120 km from Belgorod International Airport and 232 km from Voronezh Peter the Great Airport.

References

Notes

Sources

Rural localities in Oktyabrsky District, Kursk Oblast